McConnell–Neve House is a historic home located at Charlottesville, Virginia. It was built in 1894, and is a two-story, three bay, Late Victorian style frame dwelling with a -story wing. It is sheathed in wooden shingles. It features high-pitched hipped roof, irregular silhouette, and slender three-story octagonal tower with steep pyramidal roof. The house has been divided into apartments.

It was listed on the National Register of Historic Places in 1983.

References

Houses on the National Register of Historic Places in Virginia
Victorian architecture in Virginia
Houses completed in 1894
Houses in Charlottesville, Virginia
National Register of Historic Places in Charlottesville, Virginia